Rodolphe Menudier is a French shoe designer.

Described as: the very first to be a huge success both commercial and media thanks to collections of high end shoe design. 
His label was launched in 1994 and takes us back to Roger Vivier’s daring; it is a combination of inventiveness and sophistication that never gives up away on elegance and seduction. 
Trained at the AFPIC, he won fame in the “back to luxury” trend using a significant dose of sex-appeal, with his own brand and creating models for Dior with John Galliano, Christian Lacroix, Balenciaga, Paco Rabanne…
His Parisian boutique, was inaugurated in 2000 in a set by Christophe Pillet “without ostentation or gilding”, it is a concentrate of his passion in design, postmodernism and the neopunk spirit.

Florence Müller (Excerpt from 20 ans de mode contemporaine - Ed: Naïve)

He started his shoe line in 1994. The first boutique opened in Paris in 2000.

References

External links
 

Living people
French fashion designers
Shoe designers
French brands
Year of birth missing (living people)